The women's 100 metres hurdles event at the 2010 World Junior Championships in Athletics was held in Moncton, New Brunswick, Canada, at Moncton Stadium on 20, 21 and 22 July.

Medalists

Results

Final
22 July
Wind: +0.9 m/s

Semifinals
21 July

Semifinal 1
Wind: +2.0 m/s

Semifinal 2
Wind: +1.6 m/s

Heats
20 July

Heat 1
Wind: +1.3 m/s

Heat 2
Wind: -0.6 m/s

Heat 3
Wind: -0.2 m/s

Heat 4
Wind: +1.8 m/s

Participation
According to an unofficial count, 32 athletes from 24 countries participated in the event.

References

100 metres hurdles
Sprint hurdles at the World Athletics U20 Championships
2010 in women's athletics